Éric Chevillard (born 18 June 1964) is a French novelist. He has won awards for several novels including La nébuleuse du crabe in 1993, which won the Fénéon Prize for Literature.

Chevillard was born in La Roche-sur-Yon, Vendée.  His work often plays with the codes of narration, sometimes to the degree that it is even difficult to understand which story is being told.  His books have consequently been classified as postmodern literature. He has been noted for his associations with Les Éditions de Minuit, a publishing-house largely associated with the leading experimental writers composing in French today.

Awards and honors
2013 Best Translated Book Award, shortlist, Prehistoric Times

Bibliography
 Mourir m'enrhume (Dying Gives Me a Cold), Éditions de Minuit, 1987.
 Le démarcheur (The Door-to-Door Salesman), Minuit, 1989.
 Palafox, Minuit, 1990.
 Palafox, translated by Wyatt Mason for Archipelago Books, 2004.
 Le caoutchouc décidément (Definitely the Rubber), Minuit, 1992.
 La nébuleuse du crabe, Minuit, 1993. (Fénéon Prize)
 The Crab Nebula, translated by Jordan Stump and Eleanor Hardin for Bison Books, 1997.
 Préhistoire, Minuit, 1994.
 Prehistoric Times, translated by Alyson Waters for Archipelago Books, 2012.
 Un fantôme (A Ghost), Minuit, 1995.
 Au plafond, Minuit, 1997.
 On the Ceiling, translated by Jordan Stump for Bison Books, 2000.
 L'œuvre posthume de Thomas Pilaster (Thomas Pilaster's Posthumous Works), Minuit, 1999.
 The Posthumous Works of Thomas Pilaster, translated by Christopher Clarke for Sublunary Editions, 2021.
 Les absences du capitaine Cook (Captain Cook's Absences), Minuit, 2001.
 Du hérisson (On the Hedgehog), Minuit, 2002.
 Le vaillant petit tailleur, Minuit, 2004. (Prix Wepler)
 The Valiant Little Tailor, translated by Jordan Stump for Yale University Press, 2022.
 Scalps (Scalps), Fata Morgana, 2005.
 Oreille rouge (Red Ear), Minuit, 2005.
 D'attaque (By Attack), Argol, 2006.
 Démolir Nisard, Minuit, 2006. Prix Roger Caillois)
 Demolishing Nisard, translated by Jordan Stump for Dalkey Archive Press, 2011.
 Commentaire autorisé sur l'état de squelette (Authorized Commentary on the Skeleton's State), Fata Morgana, 2007.
 Sans l'orang-outan (Without the Orangutan), Minuit, 2007.
 Dans la zone d'activité (In the Active Area), graphisme par Fanette Mellier, Dissonances, 2007.
 En territoire Cheyenne (In Cheyenne Territory), Fata Morgana, illustrations de Philippe Favier, mai 2009.
 La vérité sur le salaire des cadres (The Truth about Executive Salaries), Le Cadran ligné, 2009 ("livre en un seul poème")
 Choir (Dropping), Minuit, 2010
 Dino Egger (Dino Egger), Minuit, 2011 - Prix Virilo 20111
 Iguanes et Moines (Monks and Iguanas), Fata Morgana, 2011
 L'auteur et moi, Minuit, 2012
 The Author and Me, translated by Jordan Stump for Dalkey Archive Press, 2014.
 La Ménagerie d'Agathe (Agathe's Côterie), Actes Sud, ill. de Frédéric Rébéna, 2013
 Péloponnèse (Peloponnesus), Fata Morgana, 2013
 Le Désordre azerty (The QWERTY Disorder), Minuit, 2014
 QWERTY Invectives, translated by Pietr Behrman de Sinéty for the Cahier Series of Sylph Editions, 2018.
 Juste ciel (Just Sky), Minuit, 2015
 Les Théories de Suzie (Suzie's Theories), avec Jean-François Martin, Hélium, 2015

L'Autofictif, a series of books based on his daily blog:
 L'Autofictif - Journal 2007-2008, 2009
 L'autofictif voit une loutre - Journal 2008-2009, 2010
 L'Autofictif père et fils - Journal 2009-2010, 2011
 L'Autofictif prend un coach - Journal 2010-2011, 2012
 L'Autofictif croque un piment - Journal 2011-2012, 2013
 L'Autofictif en vie sous les décombres - Journal 2012-2013, 2014
 L'Autofictif au petit pois - Journal 2013-2014, 2015

References

External links
 Official site
 Eric Chevillard's blog
 Premières pages of Démolir Nisard
 Critical bibliography (Auteurs.contemporain.info) 
 Essay on Chevillard from The Quarterly Conversation

1964 births
Living people
People from La Roche-sur-Yon
20th-century French novelists
20th-century French male writers
21st-century French novelists
Postmodern writers
French male novelists
Prix Roger Caillois recipients
Prix Fénéon winners
21st-century French male writers